Kattoor is a coastal village in Aryad Block Alappuzha district, Kerala, India. It is under Mararikulam south panchayath. Located 8 km towards North from Alappuzha and 3 km from Aryad. Kattoor is surrounded by Alappuzha Block at South , Kanjikkuzhy Block at North , Cherthala Block at North , Champakulam Block at South.

 Holy Family Higher Secondary School
The Holy Family Higher Secondary School is basically a government aided school is run by Holy Family Visitation Congregation Convent, Kattoor under the guide ship of Alleppey Diocese Corporate Management for Schools. It is one of the 3 Higher Secondary Schools run by the Corporate Management. The school has a history of more than 90 years of service to bring up education, culture and economy of this coastal village. Basically, the medium of instruction in this school is Malayalam. Because of intense desire of parents to improve their children's English Language ability and to compete in a global education and employment market, the management of school began medium of instruction and learning as English in a few divisions in each standards. As well as, a new School accredited to Central Board of Secondary Education is started along with the school.

School's alumni's are now excelling in their own careers. Many politicians, professionals such as doctors, engineers, technologists, business men, business administrators, medical professionals etc., who are products of this school are working different parts of globe.

The importance given to the Co-curricular and Extra- curricular activities is being appreciated by the public.

Hospitals
 Holy Family Hospital
 Government Homoeo Dispensary
 Government Veterinary Hospital

Temple
 Panackal SreeMahadevi Temple
 Kurikkassery Ambalam (Temple)
 Karakkal Ambalam (Temple)
 Hanumanswami temple

Church
 St. Michael's Church Kattoor - 
 St. Vicent Pallotti Church
 Kristhuraja Church, Cheriyapozhi

Convent
 Holy Family Convent Kattoor
 St. Vincent Pallotti Convent Kattoor

References

External links

Villages in Alappuzha district